Don't Go to Strangers may refer to:

Don't Go to Strangers, a 1960 album by Etta Jones
"Don't Go to Strangers", a 1954 song by Arthur Kent & Dave Mann (music) and Redd Evans (lyrics)
Don't Go to Strangers (T. Graham Brown song)
"Don't Go to Strangers", a song by J. J. Cale from Naturally